Melisa C. Michaels (May 31, 1946 – August 30, 2019) was a science fiction and mystery author.  Her novel Skirmish was nominated for a Locus Award for Best First Novel in 1986. An active member of the Science Fiction and Fantasy Writers of America (SFWA), she served on the Nebula Awards jury three times, in 1996, 1997 and 2002. In 2008, she received a SFWA Service Award.

Selected works

Skyrider series
 Skirmish (1985)  Tor Books
 First Battle (1985)  Tom Doherty Assoc
 Last War (1986) Tor Books
 Pirate Prince (1987)  Tor Books
 Floater Factor (1988)  Tor Books

Rosie Lavine series
 Cold Iron (1997)  Roc
 Sister to the Rain (1998)  Roc

Novels
 Through the Eyes of the Dead (1988)  Walker & Co
 Far Harbor (1989)  Tor Books
 World-Walker (2004)  Five Star

Anthologies containing stories by Melisa Michaels
 The Best Science Fiction of the Year 9 (1980)  Del Rey
 Horrors (1986)  Roc
 Almanahul Anticipația 1984 (1983) Știință & Tehnică

Short stories
 ″In the Country of the Blind, No One Can See″ (1979)
 ″A Demon in My View″ (1981)
 ″I Have a Winter Reason″ (1981) 
 ″I Am Large, I Contain Multitudes″ (1982)
 ″Renascence″ (1982) with Terry Carr
 ″Intermezzo″ (1983)
 ″Painted Houses″ (1999)

Essays
 ″Stalking the Wily Label″ (1998)

Cover Art
 The Darkover Concordance: A Reader's Guide (1979)
 Bones of the World (2001)
 The Ballad of Billy Badass and the Rose of Turkestan (2001)

References

Sources
 Interview
 Interview
 Reviews

External links

1946 births
2019 deaths
20th-century American novelists
21st-century American novelists
American science fiction writers
American women short story writers
American women novelists
Women science fiction and fantasy writers
20th-century American women writers
21st-century American women writers
20th-century American short story writers
21st-century American short story writers